Woodstock is a historic plantation house located near Scotland Neck, Halifax County, North Carolina. The earliest section dates to about 1783, and is a two-story, vernacular frame dwelling with later rear additions.  It was expanded in the mid-19th century to a romantic villa house three bays wide and two large bays deep with a shallow gable roof and one-story full-width front porch.   The house is set in a formal landscape designed by Joseph B. Cheshire.

It was listed on the National Register of Historic Places in 1980.

References

Plantation houses in North Carolina
Houses on the National Register of Historic Places in North Carolina
Houses completed in 1783
Houses in Halifax County, North Carolina
National Register of Historic Places in Halifax County, North Carolina